The Aligarh Institute of Technology (AIT) is a private polytechnic institute located in Karachi, Sindh, Pakistan. It was established in 1989 by Aligarh Muslim University Old Boys' Association of Pakistan (AMUOBA). It offers a Diploma of Associate Engineering (DAE) in affiliation with Sindh Board of Technical Education in following technologies:
 Electronics technology
 Computer information technology
 Electrical technology
 Civil technology
 Mechanical technology
 Bio-medical technology
 Software technology

See also
 Sindh Technical Education and Vocational Training Authority
 Sir Syed University of Engineering and Technology, Karachi

References

External links
 

Universities and colleges in Karachi
Vocational education in Pakistan